Academy of the Americas is a public pre-kindergarten through high school of Detroit Public Schools, with its primary school campus located in the former St. Hedwig School in southwest Detroit. It offers a Spanish-English bilingual program.

The high school, called Academy of the Americas High School, began in the 2014–2015 year with ninth grade students enrolled. As of 2014 it was one of two senior high school programs in southwest Detroit, along with Western International High School. The high school classes are located in Corktown, in a building next to the Ste. Anne de Detroit Catholic Church. This building opened on January 29, 2016.

References

External links 
 Academy of the Americas
 
 
 "Inside Detroit Public Schools » Academy of the Americas." Detroit Public Schools. October 8, 2008.

High schools in Detroit
Schools in Detroit
Public K-12 schools in Michigan
Bilingual schools in the United States
2014 establishments in Michigan
Detroit Public Schools Community District